Cat Ridge is a ridge in the middle of Gain Glacier in eastern Palmer Land. A descriptive name applied by the Advisory Committee on Antarctic Names; when viewed from northeastward, the limbs of the ridge are suggestive of a sprawling cat.

References
 

Ridges of Palmer Land